Compton is a village and civil parish in the Guildford district of Surrey, England. It is between Godalming and Guildford. It has a medieval church and a close connection to fine art and pottery, being the later life home of artist George Frederic Watts. The parish has considerable woodland and agricultural land, and the undeveloped portions are in the Metropolitan Green Belt.  The village is traversed by the North Downs Way and has a large western conservation area. Central to the village are the Watts Gallery, the cemetery chapel commissioned by his wife for him, two inns and the parish church.

Geography
The village is just off the Compton junction of the A3 road and is crossed parallel to its linear street by the North Downs Way. Compton contains the Watts Mortuary Chapel, built to the memory of Symbolist painter George Frederic Watts, a resident of the village. Development can be classed as ribbon development around the through road. The 2001 census gives a population of 972 living in 384 households.  The maximum elevation is on the Hog's Back at 152m, the minimum at a small brook flowing east of the village centre, at its lowest on outflow at 45m above sea level.

The western part of the village forms a conservation area (as well as a very small eastern part between The Avenue and Compton Wood).

History

Relics from the structure of the tower of the village's church, St Nicholas', suggest that the area was settled during the period of Roman occupation of Britain. Compton appears in Domesday Book of 1086 as Conton(e). It was held by Walter, son of Othere. Its domesday assets were: 11 hides; 1 church, 9 ploughs,  of meadow. It rendered £9.

St Nicholas' Church contains one of the oldest surviving carved Norman screens. The basic structure, including the tower, is Anglo-Saxon, but it has been much altered over the centuries. For example, the influence of the Normans can be seen in the arches, the timber roofing (thought to date back to 1165) and the unique carved wooden screen in the chancel. Other features were added in the generations that followed, such as the spire (14th century), the pulpit and the clock (17th century).  The church is grade I.

On the outskirts of Compton is the 16th century stately home Loseley Park. The Great Hall contains panelling taken from Henry VIII's palace at Nonsuch Park.

The Withies Inn is one of the oldest buildings in the village.

The manor of Field Place was bought in 1709 by the London publisher Samuel Manship (1665-1720), passing to his widow Anne and then their son John. His son John only had one child Anne, who eloped, and the manor was sold.

The ashes of Aldous Huxley were brought from the US on 27 October 1971 and interred in his parents' grave at Watts Cemetery.

George Frederic Watts

One of Compton’s most decorated residents by his profession was the artist who was primarily a painter, George Frederic Watts, who lived his later life at a house he called "Limnerslease", close to which is the early 20th century Watts Gallery, dedicated to his work. The gallery is open to visitors. After his death, Watts Mortuary Chapel and cloister designed by his wife Mary Seton Watts were built on a hill overlooking the village.  Among his subjects were Hope (part of his "House of Life" cycle), Orpheus and Eurydice and Dante Gabriel Rossetti.

Potteries
The Compton Potters' Arts Guild was formed in 1899 by Mary Fraser-Tytler (her name before marriage to G. F. Watts) and initially used a source of local clay discovered during the building of Limnerslease. It continued until 1954.

Artist and historian Mary Wondrausch lived and worked in the parish at the site of a former brickworks. Made of local clay from the foundations of the pottery of Mary Wondrausch, sculptor Jon Edgar's Compton Triptych was unveiled in November 2011. The three terracotta heads celebrate the parish of Compton and the diverse figures who have contributed to this community.

Literature
Arthur Conan Doyle's novels Sir Nigel and The White Company refer to the key characters Nigel Loring and Mary Loring, their daughter Maude and her husband Alleyne Edricson, 'their children and children’s children' as having their dust laid unmarked and unbrassed before the steps of the ancient altar of Compton Church. The archer Samkin Aylward is marked by a mound near the old yew in the churchyard.  A production company was registered in late 1960s until the 1970s as Sir Nigel Films/Compton Films and produced The Private Life of Sherlock Holmes. Compton is the home village of characters described in Freeman Wills Crofts' 1933 murder mystery The Hog's Back Mystery.

Demography and housing
The proportion of households in Compton who owned their home outright was 8% above the regional average.  The proportion who owned their home with a loan was 3.6% lower than the regional average; social housing formed 13.7% of homes, providing overall a greater proportion of social rented housing and lower proportion of privately rented housing relative to the average of Surrey, the district and of the United Kingdom.

The average level of accommodation in the region composed of detached houses was 28%, the average that was apartments was 22.6%.

Politics
Compton is in Guildford (UK Parliament constituency), which since its inception has fluctuated between political parties. Local government is administered by Guildford Borough Council and Surrey County Council.

At Surrey County Council, one of the 81 representatives represents the area within the Shalford division.

At Guildford Borough Council small wards of the borough are deemed appropriate to be best represented under the current constitution of councillors by two councillors.

See also
List of places of worship in Guildford (borough)

References

Sources
Forster, David. (2001). AA 50 Walks in Surrey.

External links

Compton Website
Watts Gallery
Compton Village Club

Villages in Surrey
Borough of Guildford
Civil parishes in Surrey